Each year the Mr. New Hampshire Basketball award is given to the person chosen as the best high school boys basketball player in the U.S. state of New Hampshire.  The award winner is selected by members of the New Hampshire Basketball Coaches Association via a vote that considers three distinct aspects for each candidate: academic excellence (25 percent), sportsmanship (25 percent), and basketball accomplishments (50 percent).

A second award, the WGAM Radio NH Mr. Basketball Award, is also awarded annually.  The award is open to all NH high school basketball players, regardless of grade level or division their school played in. It is voted on by about 15 members of the NH high school sports media.

NHBCA award winners

WGAM Radio award winners

References

New Hampshire
Awards established in 1989
High school sports in New Hampshire
1989 establishments in New Hampshire
Lists of people from New Hampshire
New Hampshire sports-related lists